Simeone de Summis, O.F.M. or Simon Suma (died 1672) was an Albanian Roman Catholic prelate who served as Bishop of Sapë (1647–1672).

Biography
Born in Krujë, Suma was ordained a priest in the Order of Friars Minor.
On 27 May 1647, he was appointed during the papacy of Pope Innocent X as Bishop of Sapë.
On 2 June 1647, he was consecrated bishop by Pier Luigi Carafa, Cardinal-Priest of Santi Silvestro e Martino ai Monti, with Ranuccio Scotti Douglas, Bishop of Borgo San Donnino, and Alessandro Vittrici, Bishop of Alatri, serving as co-consecrators. 
He served as Bishop of Sapë until his death in December 1672.

While bishop, he was the principal co-consecrator of Ivan Antun Zboronac, Bishop of Kotor (1656).

References 

17th-century Albanian Roman Catholic bishops
Bishops appointed by Pope Innocent X
1672 deaths
Franciscan bishops
17th-century Roman Catholic bishops in the Ottoman Empire